Amanitore (early or mid-1st century CE), also spelled Amanitere or Amanitare, was a Nubian Kandake, or queen regnant, of the ancient Kushitic Kingdom of Meroë, which also is referred to as Nubia in many ancient sources. Alternative spellings include Candace and Kentake. In Egyptian hieroglyphics the throne name of Amanitore reads as Merkare. Many Kandakes are described as warrior-queens who led forces in battle.

Life
Kandake Amanitore is often mentioned as co-regent with Natakamani although it is unclear whether she was his wife or mother.

Her royal palace was at Gebel Barkal in modern-day Sudan, which now is a UNESCO heritage site. The area of her rule was between the Nile and the Atbara rivers.

She was part of the Meroitic historical period and her reign began in 1 BCE. The rule of her successor, Amanitaraqide, was complete by 50 CE.

Amanitore is mentioned in a number of texts as a ruler. These include the temple at the Nubian capital of Napata in present-day Sudan, in a temple in Meroë near Shendi, again in Sudan, and at the Naqa Lion Temple. Images of Natakamani frequently include an image of Amanitore; however, it could be that Amanitore was his mother rather than his wife. A Kandake was a powerful position in the hierarchy of Kush. The mothers would rule and create their sons as rulers, but they also deposed their own sons too. In fact, a Kandake could order the king to commit suicide to end his rule, an order that he was required to follow.

Amanitore is buried in her own pyramid in Meroë. The tomb is approximately six metres square at its base, and not a pyramid in the mathematical sense.

Construction projects

Amanitore was among the last great Kush builders. She was involved in restoring the large temple for Amun at Meroë and the Amun temple at Napata after it was demolished by the Romans. Reservoirs for the retention of water also were constructed at Meroë during her reign. The two rulers also built Amun temples at Naqa and Amara.

The quantity of building that was completed during the middle part of the first century indicates that this was the most prosperous time in Meroitic history. More than two hundred Nubian pyramids were built, most plundered in ancient times.

New Testament
Amanitore may be the kandake mentioned in the Bible in the story about the conversion of the Ethiopian in Acts 8:26–40:

In popular culture
Amanitore leads the Nubian civilization in the 2016 4X video game Civilization VI developed by Firaxis Games.
Amanitore is an obtainable commander in the video game Rise of Kingdoms.

References

External links 

1st-century BC monarchs of Kush
1st-century monarchs of Kush
1st-century BC women rulers
1st-century women rulers
Queens of Kush
Year of birth unknown
Year of death unknown